Guro District is a district of Manica Province in western Mozambique. The principal town is Guro. The district is located in the north of the province, and borders with Changara District of Tete Province in the north, Tambara District in the east, Macossa District in the south, and Báruè District in the southwest. It had a population of 68,526 as of 2007 and 83,972  as of 2013

Geography
The major rivers on the borders of the district (the Luenha and Zambezi) have perennial flow, while others are intermittent (Nhamacombe, Mupha, Nhaduzi), fed by stormwaters.

The climate of the district is semi-arid with most rain falling from November to March.

Demographics
As of 2005, 51% of the population of the district was younger than 15 years. 22% did speak Portuguese. The most common mothertongue is Chitwe language. 79% were analphabetic, mostly women.

Administrative divisions
The district is divided into four postos, Guro (one locality), Dacata (one locality), Mandie (five localities),  and Nhamassonge (one locality).

Economy
Less than 1% of the households in the district have access to electricity.

Agriculture
In the district, there are 10,000 farms which have on average  of land. The main agricultural products are corn, cassava, cowpea, peanut, sorghum, pearl millet, and sweet potato. Livelihoods are dominated by smallholder agriculture, with millet and sorghum in well-drained soils, and maize and black-eyed peas in more humid areas. Irregularity of rain is a major constraint on the district.

Transportation
Most of the roads are in a bad state.

References 

Districts in Manica Province